Maria Margarethe Anna Schell (15 January 1926 – 26 April 2005) was an Austrian-Swiss actress. She was one of the leading stars of German cinema in the 1950s and 1960s. In 1954, she was awarded the Cannes Best Actress Award for her performance in Helmut Käutner's war drama The Last Bridge, and in 1956, she won the Volpi Cup for Best Actress at the Venice Film Festival for Gervaise.

Early life
Schell was born in the Austrian capital Vienna, the daughter of actress Margarethe (née Noé von Nordberg; 1905–1995), who ran an acting school, and Hermann Ferdinand Schell (1900–1972), a Swiss poet, novelist, playwright, and owner of a pharmacy.<ref name=Ross>Ross, Lillian and Helen. The Player: A Profile of an Art], Simon & Schuster (1961) pp. 231-239</ref> Her parents were Roman Catholics. She was the older sister of actor Maximilian Schell and lesser-known actors Carl Schell (1927-2019) and Immaculata "Immy" Schell (1935-1992).

After the Anschluss in 1938, her family moved to Zürich in Switzerland. Maria Schell began commercial training, but soon entered the film business when she met the Swiss actor and director Sigfrit Steiner.

Career

Schell premiered in Steiner's 1942 film Steibruch, side by side with the well-known Swiss actor Heinrich Gretler, and took acting lessons for several theatre engagements. After World War II, she was cast in her first leading role in the 1948 film The Angel with the Trumpet, directed by Karl Hartl. She starred in such films as The Magic Box, Dr. Holl (1951), So Little Time (1952), The Heart of the Matter (1953). Her emotional acting earned her the nickname Seelchen ("little soul"), coined by her colleague Oskar Werner.

The 1956 film Gervaise directed by René Clément was also a nominee for the Academy Award for Best Foreign Language Film; while in Hollywood, Schell met with Yul Brynner, who urged for her casting in The Brothers Karamazov (1958) in the role of Grushenka. Schell also starred with Gary Cooper in The Hanging Tree (1959), and with Glenn Ford in Cimarron (1960). Other famous movie parts included Le notti bianche (1957), Rose Bernd (1957), and Superman (1978). Schell played Mother Maria in the sequel to Lilies of the Field titled Christmas Lilies of the Field. In 1959 she appeared on "What's my Line?" as the mystery guest on February 15. In 1970, Maria Schell starred opposite Christopher Lee in The Bloody Judge by Jesús Franco.

In 1976, she starred in a Kojak episode, and also had three guest appearances in the German television series Der Kommissar and two in Derrick, in the episodes "Yellow He" (1977) and "Klavierkonzert" (1978). Schell appeared on stage, including an acclaimed performance in the 1976 Broadway play Poor Murderer by Pavel Kohout and the leading role in Friedrich Dürrenmatt's play The Visit with the Schauspielhaus Zürich ensemble.

Personal life
Schell was married twice – first to film director Horst Hächler (divorced in 1965), and second to director Veit Relin (divorced in 1986). Her daughter by her second marriage, actress Marie Theres Relin (born 1966), was married to Bavarian playwright Franz Xaver Kroetz, and has three children; she made a media and internet appearance as a spokeswoman for housewives (If Pigs Could Fly. Die Hausfrauenrevolution, 2004).

 Affair with Glenn Ford 
Schell admitted to carrying on a passionate love affair with Glenn Ford in 1960 on location of their film Cimarron. Ford’s son Peter confirmed her story in his 2011 biography Glenn Ford: A Life. In 1981, Schell gave Ford a dachshund puppy which he named Bismarck. The dog became his favorite and a constant source of comfort for him in his later years when he became ill and bedridden. After the dog’s death, he had it cremated and requested that its ashes be buried with him upon his death, which they were when Ford died in 2006.

Death
Maria Schell's last years were overshadowed by her ill health. She attempted suicide in 1991, and suffered repeated strokes. Her final public appearance was at the premiere of her brother Maximilian's documentary film My Sister Maria (2002); both were awarded the Bambi Award for their work.

Schell lived reclusively in the remote village of Preitenegg, Carinthia in the Austrian Alps until her death from pneumonia on 26 April 2005, aged 79. Upon her death, her brother released a statement, stating in part: "Towards the end of her life, she suffered silently, and I never heard her complain. I admire her for that. Her death might have been for her a salvation. But not for me. She is irreplaceable."

 Autobiographical works 
1985: Die Kostbarkeit des Augenblicks. Gedanken, Erinnerungen. Langen Müller, München, .
1998: "... und wenn's a Katz is!" Mein Weg durchs Leben. Lübbe, Bergisch Gladbach, .

Filmography

 Steibruch (1942), as Meiti / Gretl
 The Angel with the Trumpet (1948), as Selma Rosner
 Maresi (1948), as Blanka von Steinville - The Daughter
 After the Storm (1948), as Gretel Aichinger
 The Last Night (1949)
 The Angel with the Trumpet (1950), as Anna Linden
 A Day Will Come (1950), as Madeleine
 Dr. Holl (1951), as Angelika Alberti
 The Magic Box (1951), as Helena Friese-Greene
 So Little Time (1952), as Nicole de Malvines
 Until We Meet Again (1952), as Pamela
 Dreaming Lips (1953), as Elisabeth
 As Long as You're Near Me (1953), as Eva Berger
 Diary of a Married Woman (1953), as Barbara Holzmann
 The Heart of the Matter (1953), as Helen Rolt
 The Last Bridge (1954), as Dr. Helga Reinbeck
 Master of Life and Death (1955), as Barbara Bertram, geb. Hansen
 Napoléon (1955, by Sacha Guitry), as Marie-Louise, Napoleon's Austrian wife
 Die Ratten (1955), as Pauline Karka
 Gervaise (1956, by Rene Clement, from Émile Zola's L'Assommoir), as Gervaise Macquart Coupeau, une blanchisseuse douce et courageuse
 Love (1956), as Anna Ballard
 Rose Bernd (1957), as Rose Bernd
 Le Notti Bianche (1957), as Natalia
 The Brothers Karamazov (1958), as Grushenka
 One Life, by Alexandre Astruc (1958, from an eponym novel by Guy de Maupassant), as Jeanne Dandieu épouse de Lamare
 Der Schinderhannes (1958), as Julchen
 The Hanging Tree (1959), as Elizabeth Mahler
 As the Sea Rages (1959), as Mana
 Cimarron (1960), as Sabra Cravat
 The Mark (1961), as Ruth Leighton
 Das Riesenrad (1961), as Elisabeth von Hill
 Only a Woman (1962), as Lilli König
  (1963), as Beate Dehn
  (1963), as Agnès DuvillardThe Devil by the Tail (1969), as Countess Diane
 99 Women (1969), as Leonie Caroll
 The Bloody Judge (1970), as Mother Rosa
 La Provocation (1970), as Jeanne
 Dans la poussière du soleil (1972), as Gertie Bradford
 Chamsin (1972), as Miriam
 Die Pfarrhauskomödie (1972), as Irma
 The Odessa File (1974), as Frau Miller
 Change (1975), as Mama
 The Twist (1976), as Gretel
 Voyage of the Damned (1976), as Mrs. Hauser
 Kojak - Season 4, Episode 11: "The Pride and the Princess" (1976), as Sister Lepar Angelica / Princess Viva Dushan
 Derrick (1977-1978), as Luisa van Doom / Erika Rabes
 Superman (1978), as Vond-Ah
 Christmas Lilies of the Field (1979), as Valeska Piontek
 The Martian Chronicles mini-series - Season 1 (1980), as Anna Lustig
 Frau Jenny Treibel (1982, TV film), as Jenny Treibel
 Inside the Third Reich (1983), as Mrs. Speer
 Král Drozdia Brada (1984), as královna, Michalova matka
 1919 (1985), as Sophie Rubin
 Die glückliche Familie (1987-1991, TV Series), as Maria Behringer

Decorations and awards
 1951-1957, 1987, 2002: Bambi award
 1954: Honorable Mention at the Cannes International Film Festival for The Last Bridge 1956: Volpi Cup at the Venice International Film Festival for Gervaise 1957 and 1958: Golden and Silver Bravo Otto
 1974: Merit Cross of the Federal Republic of Germany
 1977: German Film Awards, Gold Award for many years of excellent work in the German film industry
 1980: Great Cross of Merit of the Federal Republic of Germany
 1983: Golden Camera
 2002: Austrian Cross of Honour for Science and Art, 1st class
 2008: Maria Schell street named in Landstrasse (Vienna's 3rd District, area Aspanggründe / Euro-gate)

References

Further reading

 Mato Weiland: Maria Schell. Die autorisierte Maria Schell-Story. Massimo-Verlag, Wien 1959 ÖNB
 Herbert Spaich: Maria Schell – ihre Filme – ihr Leben. [Heyne-Bücher, 32] Heyne-Filmbibliothek, 99, München 1986, 
 Hermann Josef Huber: Heitere Starparade. 300 Anekdoten von Hans Albers bis Maria Schell. Herder Taschenbuch Verl., Freiburg/Br., Basel, Wien 1989 UBS
 Maximilian Schell, Gero von Boehm, Thomas Montasser: Meine Schwester Maria. Europa-Verlag, Hamburg 2004, 
 Maja Keppler (Red.), Deutsches Filmmuseum [Frankfurt, Main] (Hrsg.): Maria Schell, [eine Ausstellung des deutschen Filmmuseums 31. Januar bis 17. Juni 2007 Frankfurt am Main, Juli bis Oktober 2007 auf dem Schloss Wolfsberg, Kärnten (Österreich)''. Schriftenreihe des Deutschen Filmmuseums: Kinematograph, 22, Frankfurt am Main 2006,

External links

 Obituary: Maria Schell (1926-2005)
 Photographs and literature
 Maria Schell Estate at Deutsches Filminstitut, Frankfurt am Main

1926 births
2005 deaths
20th-century Austrian actresses
Actresses from Vienna
Austrian film actresses
Austrian television actresses
Austrian people of Swiss descent
Commanders Crosses of the Order of Merit of the Federal Republic of Germany
People from Carinthia (state)
Recipients of the Austrian Cross of Honour for Science and Art, 1st class
Recipients of the Bambi (prize)
Volpi Cup for Best Actress winners
Austrian memoirists
Swiss expatriates in Austria
Swiss expatriates in West Germany
Austrian expatriates in Switzerland
Austrian expatriates in West Germany